The Stearman C2 was the second aircraft type designed by the Stearman Aircraft company. The aircraft first flew in 1927.

Design and development
The airframe of the C2 was virtually identical to the model C1. Differences included an aileron control system that actuated the single set ailerons on the upper wings via torque tubes internal to the upper wings rather than from vertical push-pull rods connected to the lower wings. All further C-series Stearmans had this system.

Various types of engines were installed on C2 aircraft. Some were air cooled while others were water-cooled. Unlike the model C1 that had the radiator located in the nose cowl, Stearman C2 aircraft with liquid-cooled engines installed had the radiator located between the main gear legs. When the follow-on but similar model C3 became the first Stearman aircraft to receive a type certificate, some of the C2B aircraft were approved as C3B aircraft.

The most popular version of the type was the C2B which had a Wright J5 Whirlwind engine installed. The C2M ("M" for mail) was powered by a 200 hp Wright J4 radial engine and had modifications to meet the specifications of Varney Airlines. This included having the front cockpit replaced by a covered mail pit.

Production

In total, 33 model C2 aircraft were manufactured with the first three built in the original Stearman plant in Venice, California.

Variants produced were:

C2 and C2A
90 hp liquid-cooled Curtiss OX-5 engine

C2B
220 hp Wright J5 air-cooled radial engine. Left and right side throttle installed as standard.

C2C
C2 model with a 180 hp Wright/Martin Hispano Suiza liquid-cooled V-8 engine

C2H(1 built)
280 hp Menasco-Salmson air-cooled radial engine and counter-clockwise rotating propeller. Custom-built aircraft with experimental "speed wings"

C2K(2 built)
128 hp Siemens-Halske SH-12 air-cooled radial engine

C2M(mail)
200 hp 9-cylinder Wright J4 air-cooled radial engine. Front cockpit replaced by a covered mail pit. Reinforced windshield to prevent cargo loading damage.

See also

Aircraft of comparable role, configuration and era 
(Partial listing, only covers most numerous types)

Alexander Eaglerock
American Eagle A-101
Brunner-Winkle Bird
Buhl-Verville CA-3 Airster
Command-Aire 3C3
Parks P-1
Pitcairn Mailwing
Spartan C3
Swallow New Swallow
Travel Air 2000 and 4000
Waco 10

Related lists 

 List of aircraft
 List of civil aircraft

References

C2
Biplanes
Single-engined tractor aircraft
Aircraft first flown in 1927